Wiger is a surname. Notable people with the surname include:

 Chuck Wiger (born 1951), American politician
 Merete Wiger (1921–2015), Norwegian novelist, author of short stories, children's writer and playwright
 Nick Wiger (born 1980), American comedian, improviser, podcast personality, and television writer